Bloody Bloody Bible Camp is a 2012 American horror-comedy/splatter film. The film was directed by Vito Trabucco and produced by Reggie Bannister, who stars as Father Richard Cummings. The film also features Tim Sullivan as a cross dressing nun and Ron Jeremy as Jesus.

Plot 
In 1977, a group of young people are massacred at the hands of Sister Mary Chopper at the Happy Day Bible Camp. Only two people survive the slaughter, Millie and Dwayne, the latter of whom was left with brain damage. Seven years later, Father Richard Cummings leads a group of teenagers to the camp, despite warnings from a concerned local about the camp, now dubbed 'Bloody Bloody Bible Camp'. Accompanying Father Cummings is Millie, who is keeping her past history with the camp a secret despite her ongoing trauma over the event. Eventually, Sister Mary Chopper resumes her slaughter, eventually leaving only Father Cummings and goth camper Jennifer alive. Father Cummings has a near death experience where he meets Jesus, who tells him that while it's OK to be homosexual, it isn't OK that he brought the teenagers here and that he must save the camp. It's revealed that the killer is actually Eugene, a goth local who had been at a convenience store that the campers had stopped at earlier in the film. Tormented by an abusive nun who raised him as a girl and led him to believe that sin must be physically punished with death, Father Cummings manages to defeat Sister Mary Chopper and bring an end to the chaos.

Cast
 Reggie Bannister...Father Richard Cummings
 Tim Sullivan... Sister Mary Chopper / Eugene
 Ron Jeremy... Jesus
 Ivet Corvea... Millie
 Matthew Aidan... Tad
 Jessica Sonneborn... Brittany
 Deborah Venegas	... Jennifer
 Jeff Dylan Graham... Dwayne
 Elissa Dowling... Betty
 David C. Hayes... JJ
 Daniel Schweiger... Brother Beau
 Christopher Raff... Timmy
 Chris Staviski... Skunk
 Jay Fields... Brother Zeke
 Troy Guthrie... Vance
 Gigi Fast Elk Porter... Mother Mary (as Gigi Bannister)

Reception 
HorrorNews.net reviewed the film, stating that it may be "offensive to some, trash to others" but that they enjoyed the movie and hoped that it would become a cult movie. ComingSoon.net also reviewed the movie, criticizing the length of time that the movie took to get to the main killings but stating that it "does a good job of recapturing the feel of late-‘70s/early-‘80s horror films".

References

External links
 
 

American comedy horror films
American splatter films
2012 horror films
2012 films
2010s comedy horror films
American slasher films
Religious horror films
Religious comedy films
Parodies of horror
Films set in 1977
Films set in 1987
2012 comedy films
American exploitation films
2010s American films